West Pointe à la Hache is an unincorporated community in Plaquemines Parish, Louisiana, United States.

The community is on the southwest bank of the Mississippi River with Pointe à la Hache directly across the river to the northeast. It is on Louisiana Highway 23 and is connected by the Pointe à la Hache Ferry to Pointe à la Hache.

Woodland Plantation, which has been depicted on the label of Southern Comfort since the 1930s, is an antebellum mansion in the community. It is listed on the National Register of Historic Places.

References

Unincorporated communities in Plaquemines Parish, Louisiana
Unincorporated communities in Louisiana
Louisiana populated places on the Mississippi River
Unincorporated communities in New Orleans metropolitan area